Wada (written: 和田 lit. "harmonious rice paddy") is a Japanese family name. Notable people of Japanese ancestry with the surname include:

 Akiko Wada (born 1950), singer
, Japanese footballer
, Japanese singer, member and leader of girl group S/mileage
, Japanese TV producer
, textile worker and memoirist during the Meiji Era
, Japanese computer science professor
, Japanese swimmer
, Japanese painter
, Japanese costume designer
, Japanese anime producer
, Japanese shogi player
, Japanese politician
 Juhn Atsushi Wada (born 1924), Japanese-Canadian neurologist
, Japanese adventurer and entrepreneur
, Japanese footballer
, Japanese composer and arranger
, baseball player
, Japanese businessman
, Japanese wrestler
, Japanese singer and songwriter
, retainer during the Sengoku Period
, Japanese graphic designer, illustrator, essayist, and film director
, Japanese footballer
, Japanese politician and TV announcer
, actor and singer
 Miho Wada, Japanese-New Zealand jazz musician
 Minoru Wada, Japanese American World War II hero
, mathematician of the Edo Period
, Japanese footballer
, Japanese screenwriter and historical novelist
, Japanese painter and costume designer
, Japanese manga artist
, Japanese musician
, Japanese handball player
, Japanese wrestler
, Japanese racing driver
, Japanese mathematician
, Japanese footballer
, Japanese footballer
, attorney and Girl Scouts leader
 Tet Wada (born 1973), actor
, Japanese baseball player
, executive (General Manager of Honda Motor Motorsports Division)
, executive (CEO of Square Enix)
 Yoshi Wada (1943–2021), sound installation artist and musician
, Japanese novelist and critic
, Japanese painter
, samurai of the Kamakura Period
, Japanese baseball player and manager
, Japanese footballer

References 

Japanese-language surnames